TX Group AG (formerly Tamedia AG) is a media company headquartered in Zurich, Switzerland. Through a portfolio of daily and weekly newspapers, magazines and digital platforms, as well as own printing facilities, it is the largest media group in the country. Since 2000, Tamedia has been listed on the Swiss Stock Exchange.

On January 1, 2020, Tamedia was renamed to TX Group AG. Aside from group management functions, TX Group has four operating companies: TX Markets, Goldbach, 20 Minuten, and Tamedia. The reuse of the Tamedia name for a subsidiary company, combined with reshuffling of brands, does create confusion.

Marketshare
In 2011, it was the biggest player in the Swiss press market, controlling a 41% market share, which rose up to 68% in French-speaking Romandie.

Holdings

Publishing
Tamedia owns a wide range of daily and weekly newspapers and magazines in different languages. One of Tamedia's most important publications is the Tages-Anzeiger, a daily newspaper based in Zurich. Tamedia also owns the weekly , the free national newspaper 20 Minuten/20 Minutes, the free , the weekly financial newspaper , the women's magazine Annabelle, the family magazine Schweizer Familie, the television supplement TV täglich, and the daily newspapers Thurgauer Zeitung and Zürichsee-Zeitung.

Further publications of Tamedia are:
 Newspapers: 20 Minuten, 20 minuti, 24 heures, Bernerbär, Berner Oberländer, BZ Berner Zeitung, BZ Langenthaler Tagblatt, Der Bund, Der Landbote, Furttaler, GHI Genève Home Information, Journal de Morges, Lausanne Cités, Le Matin, Le Matin Dimanche, Rümlanger, Sihltaler, Thalwiler Anzeiger, Thuner Tagblatt, Tribune de Genève, Züricher Unterländer, Zürichsee-Zeitung, Züritipp, L’Essentiel (in cooperation with publisher Editpress in Luxembourg), MetroXpress (Denmark)
 Magazines: 20 Minuten Friday, Bilan, Encore, Das Magazin, Femina, Guide TV, Tribune des Arts, Télétop Matin

Television
Following the takeover of Edipresse's Swiss operations, Tamedia sold its Radio and TV channels in 2011.

Other ventures
Besides its publishing segments, the media group Tamedia owns a digital portfolio with different online platforms.

In December 2018, Tamedia invested on Monito, a comparison website for international money transfer services.

News 
Tamedia is the leading participant of Newsnet, a joint venture of the Basler Zeitung as well as the Tamedia-owned newspapers BZ Berner Zeitung, Tages-Anzeiger, Der Bund, Le Matin, Tribune de Genève and 24 heures. Newsnet's editorial staff produces news content for these newspapers' web portals. In 2015, the media group introduced the 12-App (#12) which presents the day's top stories from 21 editorial teams within Tamedia. And with 20minuten.ch, Tamedia owns the biggest online newssite with the most unique clients in Switzerland.

Digital Holdings 
 Acquisitions: autoricardo.ch, car4you, Doodle, homegate.ch, hommages.ch, Olmero & renovero.ch, ricardo.ch, Starticket, Trendsales, tutti.ch
 Participations: Book A Tiger, JobCloud AG, local.ch & search.ch, moneypark.ch, Tradono, Zattoo, Lykke AG, Monito.com, Car For You

Headquarters
Its Zurich headquarters, completed in 2013, were designed by Japanese architect Shigeru Ban.

References

External links

Companies based in Zürich
Swiss companies established in 1893
Mass media companies established in 1893
Mass media companies of Switzerland
Companies listed on the SIX Swiss Exchange